Formulas Fatal to the Flesh is the fifth full-length studio album by death metal band Morbid Angel. The Satanic-themed lyrics of previous albums had been replaced with lyrics about the Old Ones, which would become the primary source of Morbid Angel's lyrical content from this point on, and has some lyrical content written in Sumerian. This is the first album to feature singer/bassist Steve Tucker, replacing David Vincent.

The title refers to the biblical symbol of the Antichrist. The letter "F" is the 6th letter of the alphabet; therefore, it could be read as "6ormulas 6atal to the 6lesh" or 666 for short, the number of the Beast.

Musical style, writing, and composition

The tunings for this record as on Covenant and Domination remained E♭ on six string guitar songs, and B♭ on seven stringed guitar songs.
The album saw considerable changes in tone from Domination. Whereas Domination was more melodic, Formulas is considered more brutal and powerful, characterized by very fast drum tempos, extremely fast blast beats, aggressive riffs, atmospheric solos, and a more demonic growl from Steve Tucker.

"Invocation of the Continual One" is made of unused music the band had composed in its early days in 1984, put together and re-recorded for this album.

Reception

The album was met with mixed critics upon release, but retrospective reception is very positive, due to its role as a landmark for the brutal death metal genre that developed in the late nineties.

Track listing
All songs written and arranged by Trey Azagthoth except "Ascent Through the Spheres" and "Hymnos Rituales de Guerra", written by Pete Sandoval.

Limited edition bonus disc
This bonus CD contains all of the isolated guitar solos performed by Trey Azagthoth. A guitar pick is included which is signed by him.

Personnel
Steve Tucker – bass, vocals
Trey Azagthoth – guitars, keyboards, vocals on "Covenant of Death" and "Invocation of the Continual One"
Pete Sandoval – drums

References

1998 albums
Morbid Angel albums
Earache Records albums
Albums recorded at Morrisound Recording